Jorma Ojanaho is a strongman competitor from Finland who is best known for competing in the 1996 World's Strongest Man competition, finishing in 6th place. Jorma won Finland's Strongest Man in 1994.

References

1970 births
Living people
Finnish strength athletes